Israel is an album by American jazz trombonists Kai Winding and J. J. Johnson featuring performances recorded in 1968 and released on the CTI label.

Reception
The Allmusic review by Scott Yanow awarded the album 2 stars and stated "This date is a bit commercial, with a small string section and woodwinds utilized on five of the nine numbers. Still, the beautiful tones of the co-leaders make this a worthwhile set ".

Track listing
 "My Funny Valentine" (Richard Rodgers, Lorenz Hart) - 4:23   
 "Israel" (John Carisi) - 5:22   
 "Catherine's Theme" (Francis Lai) - 5:14   
 "Am I Blue / Sonnyboy" (Harry Akst, Grant Clarke / Ray Henderson, Bud De Sylva, Lew Brown) - 4:32   
 "Never My Love" (Donald Addrisi, Richard Addrisi) - 2:53   
 "Saturday Night Is the Loneliest Night of the Week" (Jule Styne, Sammy Kahn) - 2:52   
 "St. James Infirmary" (Joe Primrose) - 4:04   
 "Django" (John Lewis) - 4:52   
 "Try To Remember" (Tom Jones, Harvey Schmidt) - 4:11
Recorded at Van Gelder Studio in Englewood Cliffs, New Jersey on February 19 (track 5 & 6), March 4 (track 2), March 12 (track 3 & 7), and April 16 (track 1, 4, 8 & 9), 1968

Personnel
J. J. Johnson, Kai Winding — trombone
Herbie Hancock - piano
Ross Tompkins - piano, harpsichord
Eric Gale, Bucky Pizzarelli - guitar
Ron Carter, Richard Davis - bass
Grady Tate - drums
Phil Bodner, George Marge, Romeo Penque - flute, oboe, clarinet
Walter Kane, Frank Schwartz - bassoon  
Lewis Eley, Leo Kruczek, Charles Libove, David Nadien, Eugene Orloff, Tosha Samaroff - violin
Al Brown - viola
George Ricci - cello
Eugene Bianco - harp 
Don Sebesky, J. J. Johnson, Kai Winding - arranger, conductor

References

CTI Records albums
J. J. Johnson albums
Kai Winding albums
1968 albums
Albums produced by Creed Taylor
Albums arranged by Don Sebesky
Albums recorded at Van Gelder Studio